Stephen John (Steve) Weatherley (born 26 November 1957 in Dartford, England) is a former motorcycle speedway rider who was twice runner-up in the British Speedway Under 21 Championship. 

He rode primarily for the Eastbourne Eagles and the White City Rebels, who won the British League in 1977. 

On 8 June 1979 he was paralysed whilst riding for Eastbourne at Hackney Wick Stadium, Waterden Road. He  was involved in a terrible crash with Vic Harding. Harding was killed and Weatherley was left with a broken back. He has used a wheelchair since the crash.

His nephew, Lee Richardson (1979-2012) was an international speedway rider.

References

1957 births
Living people
British speedway riders
English motorcycle racers
Eastbourne Eagles riders
White City Rebels riders
Hull Vikings riders
Poole Pirates riders
Wolverhampton Wolves riders
Cradley Heathens riders